This is a list of the highest known prices paid for sports cards. The current record price is the US$12.6million paid for a 1952 Mickey Mantle baseball card (Topps; #311) on August 28, 2022, breaking all previous records.

Background
Sports cards are a variety of trading card, small cards usually made of cardboard, which feature an image of an athlete or athletes along with identifying text. The earliest sports cards were promotional materials usually included with tobacco products and candy and often bearing an advertisement on the reverse.

The first sports card to sell for one million dollars was a T206 Honus Wagner which went for $1,265,000 at auction in 2000. , the industry brings in over one billion dollars annually for manufacturers and retailers.

14 of the 25 most valuable sports cards and 2 of the 5 priciest cards are basketball cards.

List of highest prices paid

This list includes only the highest price paid for a given card and does not include separate entries for individual copies of the same card or multiple sales prices for the same copy of a card. Thus, for example, the T206 Honus Wagner is represented on this list by one particular card's 2021 sale and does not include the same card's 2012 sale for $1.2 million or the Jumbo Wagner and its $3.12 million sale price.

Cards are evaluated by third-party services, most often Professional Sports Authenticator (PSA), Beckett Grading Services (BGS) and Sportscard Guaranty (SGC), and given a grade on a ten-point scale based on condition.

The images below do not necessarily represent the individual specimen sold but are representative of the given cards.

See also

 List of most expensive coins
 List of most expensive philatelic items
 Forbes' list of the world's highest-paid athletes

Notes

References

Auction-related lists
Lists of most expensive things
Trading cards